Cura pinguis is a species of dugesiid triclad found in Australia and New Zealand.

References
 utmost example of iteroparity

Dugesiidae